In algebraic number theory the n-th power residue symbol (for an integer n > 2) is a generalization of the (quadratic) Legendre symbol to n-th powers. These symbols are used in the statement and proof of cubic, quartic, Eisenstein, and related higher reciprocity laws.

Background and notation
Let k be an algebraic number field with ring of integers  that contains a primitive n-th root of unity 

  

An analogue of Fermat's theorem holds in  If  then 

And finally, suppose   These facts imply that

  

is well-defined and congruent to a unique -th root of unity

Definition

Properties
The n-th power symbol has properties completely analogous to those of the classical (quadratic) Legendre symbol ( is a fixed primitive -th root of unity):

In all cases (zero and nonzero)

Relation to the Hilbert symbol
The n-th power residue symbol is related to the Hilbert symbol  for the prime  by

in the case  coprime to n, where  is any uniformising element for the local field .

Generalizations
The -th power symbol may be extended to take non-prime ideals or non-zero elements as its "denominator", in the same way that the Jacobi symbol extends the Legendre symbol.

Any ideal  is the product of prime ideals, and in one way only:

The -th power symbol is extended multiplicatively:

For  then we define
 

where  is the principal ideal generated by 

Analogous to the quadratic Jacobi symbol, this symbol is multiplicative in the top and bottom parameters.

 If  then 

 

Since the symbol is always an -th root of unity, because of its multiplicativity it is equal to 1 whenever one parameter is an -th power; the converse is not true.

 If  then 
 If   then  is not an -th power modulo 
 If  then  may or may not be an -th power modulo

Power reciprocity law
The power reciprocity law, the analogue of the law of quadratic reciprocity, may be formulated in terms of the Hilbert symbols as

See also

Modular_arithmetic#Residue_class
Quadratic_residue#Prime_power_modulus
Artin symbol
Gauss's lemma

Notes

References
 

 

Algebraic number theory